The Bismarck station in Bismarck, North Dakota was built in 1900 by the Northern Pacific Railway.  It is in Mission/Spanish Revival style and was designed by architects Reed & Stem.  It "is notable for its Spanish mission-style architecture, a familiar mode in the Southwest and California but uncommon in the northern plains."  After the Northern Pacific Railway and then Burlington Northern Railroad discontinued passenger service, Amtrak's North Coast Hiawatha used the station from 1971 until it was discontinued in 1979.

It was listed on the National Register of Historic Places in 1977, as the Northern Pacific Railway Depot.

The station underwent a renovation that was completed in 2018, and a brewery was opened in the building.

Bibliography

References

External links
Bismarck, North Dakota – TrainWeb

Mission Revival architecture in North Dakota
Railway stations in the United States opened in 1873
Railway stations on the National Register of Historic Places in North Dakota
Railway freight houses on the National Register of Historic Places
Former Northern Pacific Railway stations
Former Amtrak stations in North Dakota
Railway stations closed in 1979
National Register of Historic Places in Bismarck, North Dakota
1873 establishments in Dakota Territory
Repurposed railway stations in the United States